Sihanouk International Airport (formerly Sihanoukville International Airport;) , located  east of Sihanoukville City in Sihanoukville Province, is Cambodia's third largest international airport. It is named, like the province itself, after King Norodom Sihanouk. The airport is also known as Kang Keng Airport. The IATA code KOS is derived from Sihanoukville's alternative name "Kampong Som".

History
The airfield was originally constructed in the 1960s with assistance from the Soviet Union. After a long period of dormancy during and after the Khmer Rouge era, the airport formally reopened on 5 January 2007. The 2 existing taxiways were widened and a cargo apron for 4E class aircraft was added. However, after the crash of PMTair Flight U4 241 in June 2007 shortly before landing, scheduled passenger flight service to the airport was discontinued until 2011.

Cambodia Angkor Air started a tri-weekly service from Angkor International Airport in Siem Reap on 14 December 2011. The service was further adjusted to continue Phnom Penh as well operating a triangle route Siem Reap-Sihanoukville-Phnom Penh-Siem Reap from the beginning of 31 March 2013. Starting in September 2013, airline will provide a Siem Reap-Sihanoukville route twice daily during the high peak season.

Airfield summary
 Runway Length: 3,300 metres
 Runway Width: 40 metres + shoulders
 Perpendicular Taxiway: 1
 Number of Stands: 5
 Navigation Aids and Visual Aids:
 VOR/DME (KOS 116.00 10°35'22.8N 102°38'31.5)
 NDB
 PAPI
 Meteo
 Rescue and Firefighting: ICAO Level Cat 5

Airlines and destinations

Statistics

Accidents and incidents
 On 7 July 1972, a Douglas DC-3 cargo plane of Cambodia Air Commercial registered as XW-PHW overran the runway on landing at Sihanouk International Airport without fatalities but was damaged beyond economic repair.
 On 25 June 2007, an Antonov An-24 (XU-U4A) operating as PMTair Flight U4 241 en route from Siem Reap to Sihanoukville crashed about five minutes before landing, killing all 22 passengers and crew on board.

See also 
 Phnom Penh International Airport
 Siem Reap International Airport

References

External links 
 State Secretariat Of Civil Aviation
  Sihanoukville International Airport
 Overview on Transport Infrastructure Cambodia

Airports in Cambodia
Airport
Buildings and structures in Sihanoukville province